The R150 road is a regional road in Ireland. It runs from Drogheda to the Meath coast and back inland across east County Meath.

The R150 travels east from the Drogheda's Bull Ring to the Meath coastal towns of Bettystown and Laytown, via Mornington. From Laytown the road turns west to Julianstown and crosses the M1 (no junction) en route to Duleek. The Julianstown–Duleek section underwent a major €20 million improvement project from October 2006 to September 2008, a year longer than scheduled.

The R150 intersects with the N2 at Flemingstown before ending at the R153 at Kentstown.

See also
Roads in Ireland
National primary road
National secondary road

References

Regional roads in the Republic of Ireland
Roads in County Louth
Roads in County Meath